The Hugh Baird College South Sefton Campus opened in 2009 and houses a Sixth Form Centre, where the College offers A-levels. The campus has science laboratories, a sports centre, dance studio, eating outlets, a large atrium for performances and an art studio.

On 1 December 2017, following Sefton Council approval and support, South Sefton College became part of Hugh Baird College. South Sefton College was renamed as Hugh Baird College’s South Sefton Campus and it is home to the College’s dedicated Sixth Form Centre and houses its A-level provision.

South Sefton College was a foundation sixth form located in Litherland in the English county of Merseyside.

The college was established in 2009 following a major reorganisation of secondary education in the Metropolitan Borough of Sefton.   An £11.8 million grant from the Learning and Skills Council funded the building of the college which was formally opened by Sophie, Countess of Wessex.

South Sefton College was officially a foundation school administered by Sefton Metropolitan Borough Council. The college catered for graduating students from secondary schools across the southern part of the Metropolitan Borough of Sefton.

References

Educational institutions established in 2009
2009 establishments in England
Education in the Metropolitan Borough of Sefton
Education in Merseyside